Exile on Coldharbour Lane is the debut album by Alabama 3, released on 11 November 1997 on One Little Indian and Geffen. The name and cover are references to Exile on Main St. by The Rolling Stones and Coldharbour Lane a major street in Brixton, South London best known for containing several after-hours clubs and not a few drug dealers. Recording sessions took place from March to June 1997. Upon its release, the album received favorable reviews, including an 8.9 review from Pitchfork Media. Exile on Coldharbour Lane did not chart on any album charts in the United States. The song "Sister Rosetta" was featured in the film Barnyard. "Woke Up This Morning" is best known as the opening theme music for the television series,  The Sopranos, which used the "Chosen One Mix" of that song.

Track listing

Personnel
Alabama 3
Larry Love (Rob Spragg) - vocals
 The Very Reverend Dr. D. Wayne Love (First Minister of the First Presleyterian Church of Elvis the Divine (UK)) (Jake Black) - vocals
The Mountain of Love (Piers Marsh) - analogue terrorism, harmonica, jaw's harp & vocals
Sir Real "Congaman" Love L.S.D. O.P.T. (Simon Edwards) - percussion, acoustic guitar
Mississippi Guitar Love - guitar
L.B. Dope (Johnny Delafons) - drums
The Spirit (Orlando Harrison) - keyboards
The Book of Love (Security), I.V. Lenin (Socialism in the Mainline), Lady Love and Little Eye Tie - D. Wayne's Ladies
Technical
Produced by The Ministers at Work and Boss Hogg
Engineered by John Wilkinson at The Steamroom and The Dairy
Mixed by Andy Wallace at The Town House
Track 3 contains an element of "Tell Me" performed by Howlin Wolf, a sample from "Standing at the Burying Ground" by Mississippi Fred McDowell and a sample from "Mannish Boy" by Muddy Waters.
Track 8 contains elements from "Honey Hush" performed by Johnny Burnett & The Rock 'n' Roll Trio.
Track 11 contains samples from "Oh In That Morning" by The Reverend BC Campbell and "Wrapped Up and Tangled Up" by The Reverend Charlie Jackson.

In Lovin' Memory: Sean Phelan 1971-1997

Notes
"Woke Up This Morning" is well known as the opening theme music for the HBO drama series The Sopranos, although the mix used for the show is different from the one on this album. This version is called Chosen One Mix.
"Mao Tse Tung Said" features a lengthy sample from the cult leader Jim Jones.
The second track is a cover version of John Prine's "Speed of the Sound of Loneliness".
"The Old Purple Tin (9% of Pure Heaven)" is about Tennent's Super, a 9% a.b.v. Scottish beer that comes in a purple can, which makes its consumers appear purple when aged and weathered, and thus deserves its reputation for being the drink of choice of the vagrant.
"Ain't Goin' to Goa" features the Reverend D. Wayne Love's description of A3's style: "sweet, pretty, country acid house music."

Later samples
"Woke Up This Morning"
"Got Ur Self A..." by Nas from the album Stillmatic

References 

1997 debut albums
Alabama 3 albums
Geffen Records albums
One Little Independent Records albums